Syrmoptera caritas is a butterfly in the family Lycaenidae. It is found in the Central African Republic.

References

Endemic fauna of the Central African Republic
Butterflies described in 2004
Theclinae